Peter Bordier Høj   (born 29 April 1957) is a Danish-Australian academic and Vice-Chancellor and President of the University of Adelaide. He has previously served as Vice-Chancellor and President of the University of Queensland and the University of South Australia. Educated at the University of Copenhagen, Høj completed a Bachelor of Science where he majored in biochemistry and chemistry, a Master of Science in biochemistry and genetics and a Doctor of Philosophy in Photosynthesis. He has worked in Denmark and Australia as a researcher and published multiple scientific articles. Høj has also served on a number of different company boards in a variety of roles, including current roles on the boards of CSIRO, Wine Australia and of the Australian Cancer Research Foundation. In 2017 he was elected chair of the Group of Eight, a lobby group that represents Australia’s research-intensive universities. He was the vice-chancellor of the University of Queensland from 2012-2020.

Early years and education 
Peter Høj was born in 1957, to John and Bodil Høj in Copenhagen, Denmark where he attended high school at Birkerød Statsskole. He worked in a deer meat shop with his father while at school. Høj attended the University of Copenhagen, with a focus on biochemistry and chemistry. He continued his study at the Carlsberg Laboratory where he obtained a Master of Science degree in biochemistry and genetics. Furthermore he completed his PhD in photosynthesis at Denmark’s Royal Veterinary and Agricultural University (now University of Copenhagen). Høj relocated to Melbourne in 1987 with his then partner Robyn van Heeswijk. In Melbourne, he attended the La Trobe University as a post-doctorate fellow.

Career 
In his first year at the La Trobe University he became a professor and he also obtained his own laboratory. In 1992, Høj was awarded the Boehringer-Mannheim (now the Roche Molecular Biochemicals) Medal which was then awarded to outstanding biochemists and molecular biologists under the age of 40. The University of Adelaide offered him a position as a professor of viticulture in 1994 and he was a professor at the university until September 2004. In 1997, he became the managing director of the Australian Wine Research Institute. He was the CEO of the Australian Research Council from 2004 to 2007. He served as the Vice-Chancellor and President of the University of South Australia from 2007 to 2012, of the University of Queensland from 2012-2020, and of The University of Adelaide from 2021.

Vice-Chancellor and President of the University of South Australia 
Høj was Vice-Chancellor and President of the University of South Australia from 2007 to 2012. While at the university he was very clear in his support for the merging of the University of South Australia with the University of Adelaide. When asked about the merging of the universities he said, ‘I've been very vocal on it and I clearly believe that none of the three SA universities have enough scale ... it will have to happen.’ Høj ended up accepting a role as the Vice-Chancellor and President at the University of Queensland after the merger talks failed to reach a conclusion that resulted in the two universities combining.

Vice-Chancellor and President of the University of Queensland 

Høj became Vice-Chancellor and President of the University of Queensland on 8 October 2012 and was preceded by Deborah Terry who was acting Vice-Chancellor at the time. He replaced previous Vice-Chancellor Paul Greenfield, who resigned due to a nepotism admissions scandal that allowed his daughter to be admitted to the University of Queensland medical school without meeting all the requirements. The deputy Michael Keniger also left the university due to the scandal. The Chancellor of the University of Queensland, Peter Varghese, highlighted numerous different successes of Høj in his role during a recent interview. He said that “(Høj) led the development of UQ’s first philanthropic campaign, which has now raised $400 million of our $500 million target” and “When Peter took up the Vice-Chancellor position, UQ was ranked 90 in the Academic Ranking of World Universities, today it is ranked 55” he said.

Hanban 
Høj joined Hanban (Council of Confucius Institute Headquarter) as an unpaid senior consultant in 2013 and was later appointed a member of the governing council of Confucius Institute Headquarters in 2017. He stood down in late 2018 from his position due to legal advice surrounding his required signing of Australia's new Foreign Interference Transparency Scheme. Høj’s involvement with the Institute was seen as controversial after a Four Corners investigation by the ABC found that the Chinese government and the UQ Confucius Institute had co-funded four University of Queensland courses. Furthermore a separate investigation by Four Corner’s highlighted that the Confucius Institute had been involved with honorary staff appointments and curriculum development at the University of Queensland. In May 2019 the UQ senate ceased accepting funding from the Confucius Institute. When interviewed about the situation Høj explained, "having courses concerning China is totally appropriate". He further said "It's very appropriate for universities such as ours to educate our students about Chinese politics, Chinese economics because we live in a region where China will be the largest economy in the world very soon, the largest trading partner for Australia". When questioned on the institute's involvement he said,"Is it appropriate that a Confucius Institute devises courses? No, it's not, but they don't. They're not involved in the design of the course. They're not involved in the delivery.”. The investigation interviewed Ross Babbage, senior security adviser to the federal government, and Clive Hamilton, an academic who focuses primarily on the interference of the Chinese Communist Party at Australian universities, both suggested a review into the universities' relationship with the institute. Furthermore Høj, when asked if he was influenced by the Chinese Communist party during his time at the Confucius Institute, said, "I'm very confident that I haven't been influenced."

The Ramsay Centre 
During his time as Vice-Chancellor, Høj introduced a partnership with the Ramsay Centre. The Ramsey Centre is a philanthropic institute designed “to advance education by promoting studies and discussion associated with the establishment and development of western civilisation”. Høj and the university proceeded to sign a fifty million dollar deal with the Ramsay Centre to offer an extended major in Western civilisation. The deal saw the University of Queensland obtain $50 million to fund the course, offer 30 scholarships each year worth $30,000 to students and hire 10 full-time equivalent academic staff. Høj welcomed the major, highlighting that this was a rare deal that will benefit many students. Alternatively there was much public debate about the introduction of the major, with many staff, students and members of the public disagreeing with the decision over fears of academic freedom.

Controversy with Drew Pavlou 

Høj also had to deal with the controversy surrounding student Drew Pavlou, who organised many rallies supporting Hong Kong against China, and protests of UQ’s financial ties with China via the Confucius Institute. Drew was originally suspended for serious misconduct for two years. However, the university reduced it to a semester after an appeal to the university's Senate Disciplinary Appeals Committee (SDAC). The University of Queensland was severely criticized by Liberal and National MP’s such as Dave Sharma and Matt Canavan who said that this incident “only fuelled claims that UQ was pro-China before it is pro-student". Current affairs program 60 Minutes conducted an investigation on the incident causing Høj to make a statement via email that reiterated there were no foreign influence on decisions made at the university or impact the freedom of speech on campus.

He retired from his position as Vice-Chancellor and President at the University of Queensland on 31 July 2020 after having announced his resignation in May 2019. He was replaced by Deborah Terry.

Notable Published Works 
Peter Høj has published a number of journal articles. These include but are not limited to:
 Identification of a chloroplast-encoded 9-kDa polypeptide as a 2[4Fe-4S] protein carrying centers, 1987, journal article in the Journal of Biological Chemistry, written with Ib Svendsen, Henrik Vibe Scheller, and Birger Lindberg Møller.
 Molecular evolution of plant β‐glucan endohydrolases, 1995, journal article in The Plant Journal, written with Geoffrey B. Fincher
 Do cytosolic factors prevent promiscuity at the membrane surface?, 1993, journal article in the FEBS Letters journal, written with Trevor Lithgow and Nicholas J. Hoogenraad
 The 'haze proteins' of wine - A summary of properties, factors affecting their accumulation in grapes, and the amount of bentonite required for their removal from wine. (2000). Proceedings of the ASEV 50th Anniversary Annual Meeting. 149-154, written with D.B Tattersall, K. Adams, K.F. Pocock, Yoji Hayasaka and R. Heeswijck
 Resistance to an Herbivore Through Engineered Cyanogenic Glucoside Synthesis. Science. 293. 1826-8. 10.1126/science.1062249. (2001) The entire pathway for synthesis of the tyrosine-derived cyanogenic glucoside dhurrin has been transferred from Sorghum bicolor to Arabidopsis thaliana. Here, we document that genetically engineered plants are able to synthesize and store large amounts of new natural products. The presence of dhurrin in the transgenic A. thaliana plants confers resistance to the flea beetle Phyllotreta nemorum, which is a natural pest of other members of the crucifer group, demonstrating the potential utility of cyanogenic glucosides in plant defense. Written with David Tattersall, Søren Bak, Patrik Jones, Carl Olsen, Jens Nielsen,  Mads Hansen, and Birger Møller
 Multiple glucosyltransferase activities in the grapevine Vitis vinifera L. (2008). Australian Journal of Grape and Wine Research. 4. 48 - 58. 10.1111/j.1755-0238.1998.tb00134.x. Written with Christopher Ford
 Cloning and Characterization of Vitis viniferaUDP-Glucose:Flavonoid 3-O-Glucosyltransferase, a Homologue of the Enzyme Encoded by the Maize Bronze-1Locus That May Primarily Serve to Glucosylate Anthocyanidins in Vivo. (1998). The Journal of biological chemistry. 273. 9224-33. 10.1074/jbc.273.15.9224. Written with Christopher Ford and Paul Boss
 Identification and characterization of a fruit-specific thaumatin-like protein which accumulates at very low levels in conjunction with the onset of sugar accumulation and berry softening in. (1997). Plant physiology. 114. 759-69. Written with D. Tattersall and R. Heeswijck

Appointments, memberships, honours and awards 
Høj is currently a board member of Wine Australia and of the Australian Cancer Research Foundation. He was a board member at the CSIRO from 2011-2014. He was the deputy chair of Universities Australia and chair of the Group of Eight (Go8) research intensive universities. Høj has served as a private member of the Prime Minister's Science Engineering and Innovation Council (1999-2004) and as an ex-officio member (2006-2007). In 2016 he became a member of the Leadership Council on Cultural Diversity and a member of STEM Males Champions of Change,. He is a member of the Steering Group for IP Group ANZ. Høj is a fellow of the Australian Academy of Science, of the Australian Academy of Technological Sciences, a fellow of the (US) National Academy of Inventors and Engineering and a foreign member (Natural Sciences Class) of the Royal Danish Academy of Sciences and Letters. He is an immediate past member of the Australian government’s Medical Research Advisory Board (April 2016 to July 2020). He was awarded the Centenary Medal in 2002 by the Australian Government for his services to Science and the Australian wine industry. In 2015 he received the 2015 Outstanding Individual of the Year Award from the Council of Confucius Institute also known as Hanban. He was made a Companion of the Order of Australia (AC), Australia's highest civil order, in January 2019 for "eminent service to higher education and to science, particularly to the commercialisation of research, and to policy development and reform." In April 2019, the Council for Advancement and Support of Education (CASE)  presented Høj with its Asia-Pacific Leadership Award.
Høj has five honorary doctorates, from the University of Copenhagen, the University of South Australia, The University of Adelaide, La Trobe University, and The University of Queensland. He was elected a Fellow of the Australian Academy of Science in 2022.

Personal life 

Høj met and later married Dr Robyn van Heeswijk (1956-2003). She was an Australian researcher whom he met while he was studying and working in the Carlsberg Laboratory. His wife died of breast cancer in September 2003 at the age of 47. He has two children, a son Torbjørn, and daughter, Stine. He moved to Australia in 1987, and Høj is a dual Australian/Danish citizen.

Høj’s current partner is Mandy Thomas, the former executive dean of the Creative Industries Faculty at Queensland University of Technology, and former Pro Vice-Chancellor Research at The Australian National University.

References 

Vice Chancellors of the University of South Australia
Academic staff of the University of Queensland
Living people
Companions of the Order of Australia
Fellows of the Australian Academy of Science
Fellows of the Australian Academy of Technological Sciences and Engineering
Recipients of the Centenary Medal
1957 births
Carlsberg Laboratory staff